Global Greek Radio is a Greek Internet radio station. Its first live broadcast was on April 13, 2007. The station consists of five streams: the hit mix stream, the ballads stream, the Zeibekiko stream, Potpourri and a folk (Laika) stream.

The station provides new content from Greece to an overseas Greek-speaking audience.

Radio stations in Greece
Greek-language radio stations